The climbing perch (Anabas testudineus) is a species of amphibious freshwater fish in the family Anabantidae (the climbing gouramis).  A labyrinth fish native to Far Eastern Asia, the fish inhabits freshwater systems from Pakistan, India, Bangladesh  and Sri Lanka in the west, to Southern China and Japan in the east, and to Southeast Asia west of the Wallace Line in the south.  It is likely that Anabas testudineus is a species complex, with the binomial name applied to what are actually several different species. With further study, populations of this fish may be divided up into separate species and given new names.

Outside its native ranges, it is an invasive species that can live without water for 6–10 hours and move on land by crawling/wriggling the body with its pectoral fins. It is believed that the fish may be invading new territories by slipping aboard fishing boats. The fish has been established in some islands east of the Wallace Line, in eastern Indonesia and Papua New Guinea, and is also believed to be advancing toward Northern Australia. In late 2005, the fish was discovered on Saibai Island and another small Australian island in the Torres Strait north of Queensland, about three to four miles south of Papua New Guinea.

As food
The climbing perch is important as a food fish in certain regions of South Asia and Southeast Asia, where its ability to survive out of the water for extended periods of time, provided it is kept moist, improves its marketability.

See also
List of Thai ingredients

References

External links

testudineus
Taxa named by Marcus Elieser Bloch
Fish described in 1792